Močėnai (formerly) is a village in Kėdainiai district municipality, in Kaunas County, in central Lithuania. According to the 2011 census, the village was uninhabited. It is located 2.5 km from Dotnuva, 3.5 km from Sirutiškis, by the rivers of Vensutis and Kruostas. A railway Vilnius-Šiauliai goes by the village.

At the beginning of the 20th century Močėnai was an okolica, where the Baginavičiai, Boreišiai, Beinaravičiai, Citavičiai, Kolnickiai, Liaudanskai, Sipavičiai, Staškevičiai, Jasudavičiai families had their property.

Demography

References

Villages in Kaunas County
Kėdainiai District Municipality